Common Thread: The Songs of the Eagles is a tribute album to American rock band Eagles. It was released in 1993 on Giant Records to raise funds for the Walden Woods Project. The album features covers of various Eagles songs, as performed by country music acts. It was certified 3× Platinum in the United States by the Recording Industry Association of America (RIAA) on June 27, 1994, honoring shipments of three million copies in the United States. Several cuts from the album all charted on the Billboard Hot Country Songs charts after the album's release, the most successful being Travis Tritt's rendition of "Take It Easy" at number 21. Common Thread won all of its performers a Country Music Association Award for Album of the Year at the 1994 ceremony.

Background
The album was initiated by Eagles co-founder Don Henley with help from the band's manager, Irving Azoff. It was intended as a charity album to raise funds for the Walden Woods Project that Henley founded in 1990 to buy the land around Walden Pond in Concord, Massachusetts. On the back cover of the album, it states:

The idea for a charity album with country musicians came after a Walden Woods benefit concert in Los Angeles in May 1992 where several country artists also appeared. Later in the year at the 1992 Country Music Awards show, where Henley performed with Trisha Yearwood in a duet, a number of artists told Henley how the Eagles’ music had inspired them. Henley and Azoff then decided that the project may be feasible, and with the help of record producer James Stroud, a number of country musicians were chosen for the album. The Eagles themselves were not involved as a band in this project, however, and none of its members played on the album, although Timothy B. Schmit provided harmony vocals for Vince Gill's rendition of "I Can't Tell You Why".

"Take It Easy" 
The most notable track in the album was the cover of "Take It Easy" by Travis Tritt. In March 1994, the song reached No. 21 on the US Country chart, and No. 12 on the Canadian RPM chart.  For the music video of his rendition of "Take It Easy", Tritt requested that Eagles join him for the filming, and the resulting video featured the full Long Run-era lineup of the Eagles (Glenn Frey, Don Henley, Don Felder, Joe Walsh, and Schmit). It would be the first time since disbanding in 1980 that the five members of the band appeared together (Frey, Henley, Walsh and Schmit, however, had all united for a benefit concert in 1990).  Their appearance on the video subsequently led to the band being officially reformed. Both Frey and Henley met with their management over lunch two months later and agreed to a reunion. A new album, Hell Freezes Over, was released and a concert tour launched the following year. Frey, who had previously been reluctant to reunite with the band, later said of the making of the video: "After years passed, you really sort of remember that you were friends first ... I just remembered how much we genuinely had liked each other and how much fun we'd had."

Critical reception

An uncredited review from AllMusic rated the album 2 out of 5 stars, stating that "Ironically, all of the interpretations on Common Thread are more pop/rock-oriented than the original versions, making the album a well-intentioned but pointless exercise." David Browne of Entertainment Weekly rated the album "B−". He criticized the album for lacking "harder songs, like 'Life in the Fast Lane'", as well as the arrangements of the artists' recordings. Although he described the latter as "slavishly devoted to the original recordings", Browne thought that the vocal performances of Tanya Tucker, Alan Jackson, and John Anderson were among the strongest.

Track listing

Personnel
Compiled from liner notes.

Musicians

"Take It Easy"
Larry Byrom – acoustic guitar
Sonny Garrish – steel guitar
Byron House – bass guitar
Dann Huff – electric guitar
Paul Leim – drums
Steve Nathan – keyboards
Joe Spivey – banjo
Curtis Wright – background vocals
Curtis Young – background vocals

"Peaceful Easy Feeling"
Denny Dadmun-Bixby – bass guitar
Del Gray – drums
Porter Howell – 6-string bass, acoustic guitar, electric guitar
Dwayne O'Brien – lead vocals, background vocals 
Duane Propes – background vocals
Tim Rushlow – background vocals

"Desperado"
Dane Bryant – keyboards
Dick Gay – drums
Dann Huff – electric guitar
Hayden Nicholas – electric guitar
Nashville String Machine – strings
Jeff Peterson – steel guitar
Jake Willemaim – bass guitar
Martin Young – acoustic guitar

"Heartache Tonight"
John Anderson – background vocals
Larry Byrom – acoustic guitar
Dann Huff – electric guitar
Paul Leim – drums
Gary Smith – keyboards
Glenn Worf – bass guitar
Curtis Wright – background vocals
Curtis Young – background vocals

"Tequila Sunrise"
Eddie Bayers – drums
Stuart Duncan – fiddle
Paul Franklin – steel guitar
Roy Huskey Jr. – upright bass
Brent Mason – electric guitar
Hargus "Pig" Robbins – keyboards
John Wesley Ryles – background vocals 
Keith Stegall – acoustic guitar

"Take It to the Limit"
Eddie Bayers – drums
Suzy Bogguss – background vocals
Beth Nielsen Chapman – background vocals
Dan Dugmore – steel guitar
Kirk "Jellyroll" Johnson – harmonica
Matt Rollings – keyboards
Tom Roady – percussion
Brent Rowan – acoustic guitar, electric guitar
Leland Sklar – bass guitar
Harry Stinson – background vocals

"I Can't Tell You Why"
Vince Gill – background vocals 
Jim Horn – soprano saxophone
David Hungate – bass guitar
George Marinelli – electric guitar
Steve Nathan – Hammond B-3 organ, synthesizer
Timothy B. Schmit – background vocals
Milton Sledge – drums
Pete Wasner – Wurlitzer electric piano

"Lyin' Eyes"
Gene Johnson – mandolin, background vocals
Jimmy Olander – acoustic guitar, electric guitar
Brian Prout – drums
Marty Roe – lead vocals
Dan Truman – keyboards
Dana Williams – bass guitar, background vocals

"New Kid in Town"
Eddie Bayers – drums
Joe Chemay – background vocals
Garth Fundis – background vocals
Al Kooper – Hammond B-3 organ
George Marinelli – electric guitar
Matt Rollings – keyboards
Dave Pomeroy – bass guitar
Steuart Smith – acoustic guitar, electric guitar
Harry Stinson – background vocals
Billy Joe Walker Jr. – acoustic guitar

"Saturday Night"
Billy Dean – background vocals
Dan Dugmore – steel guitar
Rob Hajacos – fiddle
John Barlow Jarvis – keyboards
Brent Rowan – electric guitar
Biff Watson – acoustic guitar
Lonnie Wilson – drums
Glenn Worf – bass guitar

"Already Gone"
Eddie Bayers – drums
Gary Burr – background vocals
Larry Byrom – acoustic guitar, electric guitar
Carol Chase – background vocals
Steve Gibson – electric guitar
John Barlow Jarvis – keyboards
Michael Rhodes – bass guitar
Dennis Wilson – background vocals

"Best of My Love"
Bruce Bouton – steel guitar
Mark Casstevens – acoustic guitar
Bill LaBounty – keyboards
Brent Rowan – electric guitar
John Wesley Ryles – background vocals
Dennis Wilson – background vocals
Lonnie Wilson – drums, percussion
Glenn Worf – bass guitar

"The Sad Café"
Michael Black – background vocals
Larry Byrom – acoustic guitar
Paul Franklin – steel guitar
Dann Huff – electric guitar
Paul Leim – drums
Gary Prim – keyboards
Dennis Wilson – background vocals
Glenn Worf – bass guitar
Curtis Young – background vocals

Technical
Carl Gorodetzky – string contractor on "Desperado"
Joe Layne – string copyist on "Desperado"
Jim Ed Norman – string arrangements on "Desperado"

Production 
The 1994 Country Music Association (CMA) award for Album of the Year was awarded jointly to Suzy Bogguss, Tony Brown, Don Cook, Jerry Crutchfield, Billy Dean, Christy DiNapoli, Garth Fundis, Doug Grau, Scott Hendricks, Richard Landis, Lynn Peterzell, Monty Powell, Keith Stegall, and James Stroud for their contributions in producing the album.
 Executive Production: James Stroud
 Production Assistants: Lisa Bradley, Allison Brown, Ginny Johnson, Scott Paschall, Doug Rich, Roxanne Stueve, Jane West
 Engineers: Mike Bradley, Mike Clute, John Kelton, Tim Kish, Gary Laney (also mix assistant), Steve Lowery, Steve Marcantonio, Mike McCarthy, Lynn Peterzell (also overdub engineer), Csaba Petocz, Marty Williams
 Assistant Engineers: Derek Bason (also assistant engineer for overdubs), Pasquale Delvillaggio, Mark Hagen (also mix assistant), Ken Hutton (also assistant engineer for overdubs), Julian King (also assistant engineer for overdubs & mix assistant), Russ Martin, Herb Tassin, John Thomas II (also mix assistant), Craig White
 Mixing: Mike Bradley, Garth Fundis, John Guess, John Kelton, Lynn Peterzell, Marty Williams (also mix assistant)

Charts and certification

Weekly charts

Year-end charts

Charted songs

Certifications

References 

Country albums by American artists
1993 compilation albums
Giant Records (Warner) compilation albums
Country music compilation albums
Eagles (band)
Tribute albums
Charity albums